Madhyamam Azhchappathippu or Madhyamam Weekly is a weekly Malayalam–language cultural magazine published by the Madhyamam Group from Kozhikode, India.

References

External links
 Official website

1998 establishments in Kerala
Cultural magazines
Literary magazines published in India
News magazines published in India
Political magazines published in India
Weekly magazines published in India
Magazines established in 1998
Malayalam-language magazines